Itene may refer to:

Itene language, Bolivia
Oghenekaro Itene, Nigerian actor